The Aizi (also known as Ahizi or Kpokpo) are a sub-group of the Kru people. The Aizi inhabit the Ébrié Lagoon in the Ivory Coast. The Aizi languages include Tiagba, Mobu, and Apro.

References

Ethnic groups in Ivory Coast